Elissa Shevinsky is an American technology executive, entrepreneur, cybersecurity expert, public speaker, and author.

Education 
Shevinsky attended Benjamin Cardozo High School, before studying for a Political Theory major at Williams College, where she also took classes in Computer Science, graduating in 2001.

Early career

In 2010, Shevinsky defended her company against The New York Times, as co-owner of Neighborhoodies, over the use of the "New York Herald Tribune" logo on T-shirts. Shevinsky argued that the trademark had been abandoned. In 2012, she founded two NYC-focused dating sites, MakeOut Labs and JoinJspot.

Shevinsky co-founded Glimpse, an encrypted photo and video-sharing app, with Pax Dickinson in 2013. At Glimpse, Shevinksy served as chief executive of the company.

In 2015 Shevinsky was funded by MACH37 for Jekudo Privacy Company, co-organized information security conference SecretCon, and edited Lean Out: The Struggle for Gender Equality in Tech and Start-up Culture.

In 2016, Shevinsky joined Brave as Head of Product.

Current career

Shevinsky has spoken and written on enterprise security policy. She spoke on the potential for social media to influence election outcomes at HOPE XI. Shevinsky continues to be an organizer of SecretCon.

In 2018 Shevinsky spoke on information security at universities and infosec conferences. She served as chief operating officer of SoHo Token Labs, building developer tools for smart contracts.

In 2019 Shevinsky started serving as CEO at Faster Than Light. Shevinsky taught a course titled "Introduction to Tech Entrepreneurship" at the Computer Science Department of Williams College."

Honors

Lean Out: The Struggle for Gender Equality in Tech and Start-up Culture was listed by Inc. Magazine as one of the 100 best business books of 2015.

In 2018, Shevinsky was named "Woman of the Decade" by Williams College in a speech where she announced she wanted to lead the way for the development and protection of privacy for the following decade.

Personal life

Shevinsky advocates for niceness and inclusivity in the workplace, especially within the tech and security industries. In a 2015 post on harassment and trolling in Silicon Valley, Shevinsky wrote: "I'd like to see less harassment. That's my position. Less harassment, for everyone. I do hope this isn't a controversial statement." When James Damore was fired by Google, Shevinsky was widely quoted saying that speech "questioning the technical qualifications of people based on race or gender" was potentially within the purview of Title VII of the Civil Rights Act, which prohibits employment discrimination based on race, color, religion, sex, and national origin. As a Press Lead for the 2018 HOPE conference in NYC, Shevinsky called for stronger enforcement of the Code of Conduct.

Bibliography 
 Lean Out: The Struggle for Gender Equality in Tech and Start-up Culture: OR Books, 2015.
 Social Entrepreneurship: How Businesses Can Transform Society: Praeger, 2012.

Film 

Shevinsky appears in the documentary CODE: Debugging the Gender Gap. She is also a cast member in the documentary Silenced.

References

1979 births
Living people
21st-century American businesspeople
21st-century American non-fiction writers
21st-century American women writers
American business writers
Women business writers
American computer businesspeople
American feminist writers
American technology chief executives
American technology writers
American women chief executives
American women computer scientists
American computer scientists
Writers from San Francisco
Activists from California
American women non-fiction writers
Benjamin N. Cardozo High School alumni
Williams College alumni
21st-century American businesswomen